Keith Robert Jennings is a British chemist known for his contributions to mass spectrometry.

Early life and education 
 1956 Ph.D. Queen’s College Oxford

Research interests 
 Structural studies on proteins of significant biological interest

Awards 
 1985 Thomson Medal for International Service to Mass Spectrometry
 1995 Distinguished Contribution in Mass Spectrometry Award
 1998 Aston Medal awarded by the British Mass Spectrometry Society
 1998 Field and Franklin Award for Outstanding Achievement in Mass Spectrometry

References

External links
Information from University of Warwick website

British chemists
Mass spectrometrists
Alumni of The Queen's College, Oxford
Academics of the University of Warwick
Academics of the University of Sheffield
Living people
1932 births
Thomson Medal recipients